Artematica Entertainment (known as Artematica) is an Italian developer of software, especially video games, established in the comune of Chiavari, near Genoa. The company develops on the platforms: Android, Apple's iOS, Facebook, Mobile phones, PC, Sony (PlayStation 2, PlayStation 3, and PSP), Nintendo (DS, and Wii), and Web.

The company's games are published worldwide by partners such as: 505 Games, Akella, Black Bean Games, Codemasters, DreamCatcher Interactive, DTP-AG, Halifax, Leader, Lighthouse Interactive, Micro Application, Strategy First, Ubisoft, and Warner Bros. Interactive Entertainment.

Games developed

Official titles

Advergames

 500 Twin Air: The Face Race
 Challenge Juventus (a.k.a. Sfida la Juventus)
 Coconut Game (a.k.a. Cocco Game)
 Cyber Top
 Formula 1 TIM
 Lola Game
 Monster Allergy (a.k.a. Monster Allergy: Il domatore di mostri)
 Monster Hotel
 Monsters & Pirates (a.k.a. Mostri & Pirati)
 Nutella Football Game
 The Pallastrike on Easter Island (a.k.a. La Pallastrike sull'Isola di Pasqua)
 Pully the Game
 The Straspeed (a.k.a. Gli Straspeed a Crazy World)
 The Skatenini (a.k.a. Gli Skatenini e le dune dorate)
 Winx Club
 Working Like a Machine

Kids (playground) games
 Alice in Wonderland
 Pinocchio
 Robin Hood
 Sandokan
 Tommy & Oscar (a.k.a. Tommy & Oscar: Il canto del cristallo)
 Tony Wolf: The Wood (a.k.a. Tony Wolf - Il Bosco)
 Tony Wolf: Gnomes (a.k.a. Tony Wolf - Gnomi)
 Twenty Thousand Leagues Under the Sea

ITV games
 TV show - Tickle [a.k.a. Solletico] (Rai 1):
 "Basket Mio"
 "Il gioco delle bolle"
 "Redazione Misteri" 
 "Time Wings"

External links
 

Video game companies established in 1996
Video game companies of Italy